Pietro Fanucci (born 21 July 1988) is a retired Italian tennis player.

Fanucci has a career high ATP singles ranking of 900 achieved on 14 September 2009. He also has a career high ATP doubles ranking of 581 achieved on 29 September 2008.

Fanucci made his ATP main draw debut at the 2007 Croatia Open Umag after receiving a wildcard for the doubles main draw.

Challenger and Futures finals

Doubles: 6 (3–3)

References

External links

1988 births
Living people
Italian male tennis players
21st-century Italian people